General Inspector of the Armed Forces was an office created in the Second Polish Republic in 1926, after the May Coup.

The General Inspector reported directly to the President, and was not responsible to the Sejm (parliament) or the government. In the event of war, the General Inspector was to become the Commander-in-chief of the Polish Armed Forces.

Following the German invasion of Poland in 1939 and the post-war establishment of the Polish People's Republic, the position was retained by the Polish government-in-exile until 1980.

List of General Inspectors

† denotes people who died in office.

Second Polish Republic

Rydz-Śmigły went into exile on 18 September 1939, during the German invasion of Poland. Afterwards, all General Inspectors were in exile (and increasingly connected with educational activities such as cooperation with the London-based Polish Institute and Sikorski Museum).

Polish government-in-exile

Duch died on 9 October 1980. Afterwards, in place of the GISZ, a Military Council was created, led by gen. bryg. Klemens Rudnicki.

See also
Polish General Staff
Ministry of National Defence (Poland)
Captain general
Inspector general

Notes

1926 establishments in Poland
1980 disestablishments
Military history of Poland